Eivind Holmsen (5 July 1894 – 22 March 1990) was a Norwegian shooter who competed in the early 20th century in rifle shooting.

He was born in Berg, Østfold. At the 1924 Summer Olympics he finished nineteenth in the trap event and seventh in the team clay pigeons event.

He died in 1990 in Moss.

References

1894 births
1990 deaths
ISSF rifle shooters
Norwegian male sport shooters
Shooters at the 1924 Summer Olympics
Olympic shooters of Norway
People from Halden
Sportspeople from Viken (county)